Kosciuška is the masculine form of a Lithuanian family name. Its feminine forms  are: Kosciuškienė (married woman or widow) and Kosciuškaitė (unmarried woman).

Notable people with the surname include:

 Tadas Kosciuška (1765-1794), Lithuanian name of Tadeusz Kościuszko
 Vaclovas Kosciuška (1911-1984), Lithuanian painter and graphic designer